Xiong Ziqi (born 6 June 1992), known professionally as Dylan Xiong, is a Chinese actor and singer. He has been a member of Taiwanese boyband SpeXial since 2016.

Biography 
In 2012, Xiong participated in the recording of Meng Xiang He Chang Tuan, and became a member of Rainbow Chamber Singers. In 2013, Xiong served as a backup vocalist for the final episode of the reality program Chinese Idol. The same year, he participated in Hunan TV's singing competition Super Boy. In 2014, Xiong made his acting debut in the television series  Lao Ba Tai Jiong.

In 2016, Xiong became a member of SpeXial and participated in the recording of their 4th album, Boyz On Fire. Along with several of his bandmates, he participated in the costume drama series Men with Sword and its sequel.

In 2017, Xiong starred in the youth sports television series, My Mr. Mermaid, wherein he received recognition for his acting skills. He also took on the lead role in the fantasy web drama Painting Heart Expert. The same year, he released his first solo album, Part One. Xiong was cast in the youth campus drama One and Another Him, as well as romance melodrama  As Long As You Love Me.

In 2018, Xiong starred in the romantic comedy web drama Pretty Man. In 2019, Xiong starred in youth drama Another Me, based on Anni Baobei's novel of the same name.

Filmography

Film

Television series

Variety shows

Discography

Albums

Singles

Awards and nominations

References 

1992 births
Living people
Chinese male film actors
Chinese male television actors
21st-century Chinese male actors
Chinese pop singers
Chinese idols
Male actors from Liaoning
Singers from Liaoning
Shanghai Conservatory of Music alumni
People from Tieling
21st-century Chinese male singers